Noé Duchaufour Lawrance  is a French interior and product designer born in France in 1974.

His career began at the turn of the 2000s with the delivery of the “Sketch” restaurant in London, which earned him, among other things, the “Best Design” award awarded by “Time Out” magazine in 2003.

More recently he initiated the project 'Made in Situ' in Lisbon.

Biography 

Noé Duchaufour-Lawrance completed his education in furniture design from École nationale supérieure des arts décoratifs and in metal sculptures from École nationale supérieure des arts appliqués, between 1992 and 1997. In his career, he has designed a wide range of furniture collections, held exhibitions and completed many interior design projects such as boutiques for Montblanc, Air France lounge areas, the interior of the Ciel de Paris and London Sketch restaurants, as well as private residences.

Throughout the span of his career, he has created a unified body of work with a narrative deeply rooted in nature. 
Most recently, he has initiated the project MADE IN SITU, a gallery based in Lisbon which works with Portuguese artisans.

Product design 

His product designs range from designer chairs to lamps to sofas. He has designed many products for leading companies like Saint Louis, Hermès, Ligne Roset, Cinna, Ceccotti collezioni, Tai Ping and Bernhardt Design, Baccarat, and Petite Friture. Some of his recent creations include the 'Hybride' chair for Cinna, Market chair for Petite Friture and the 'Fluid' lamp for Forestier. Most recently, he designed the 'Folia' collection for Saint-Louis.

In 2021, the exhibition “Emphatic: Discovering a Glass Legacy” at Punta Conterie Gallery in Murano, Italy, included works by Duchaufour-Lawrance, as well as designers Ini Archibong, GamFratesi, Benjamin Hubert, Richard Hutten, Luca Nichetto, Elena Salmistraro and Marc Thorpe.

Awards and honors 

 NeoCon Silver Award, Lounge Furniture Collections category, for the Modern Family Collection, Bernhardt Design
 NeoCon Silver Award, Side Tables category, for tables Chance and Clue, Bernhardt Design
 Label Via 2015 for “Ciel!” chair edited by Tabisso and the desk “Inside World” edited by Cinna
 Janus du Commerce Air France, salon business CDG, hall M
GQ Men of the year 2012 "Best Designer"
Red Dot Award Product design 2011 for the Bernhardt Design Corvo chair
Best of NeoCon GOLD Award for the Bernhardt Design Corvo chair
Laureat for the "L’Empreinte de l’Année" and Talents du luxe et de la création 2010
Award "Elle Déco International Design Awards"
Wallpaper Design Awards 2009 for the bed "Buonanotte Valentina" edited at Ceccotti Collezioni
Designer of the year  Scènes d’intérieur, Maison & Objet, Paris
Time out magazine eating and drinking  awards, Restaurant Sketch, Best design, London
Hotel and restaurant Magazine, Restaurant Sketch, Best design, London
Theme Magazine, Restaurant Sketch, Best design, London
Tatler Restaurant Awards, Best Design: The Gallery, Restaurant Sketch, London

Personal and collective exhibitions

2016 
 Individual exhibition: "Carte blanche", exhibition of the Transmissions collection, Galerie des Gobelins, Paris
 Collective exhibition: "Design @ Farnese", exhibition of the Kinetic table, Palazzo Farnese, Rome
 Individual exhibition as part of the Grand Paris D'Days Design Festival: Exhibition of the Odyssey table at the invitation of the Manufacture of Sèvres, Galerie de Sèvres, Paris
 Collective exhibition: exhibition of the Transmissions collection, exhibition AD, Hôtel de la Marine, Paris

2015 
 Collective exhibition: "The cabinet of curiosities" by Thomas Erber, exhibition of the Mangrove table, Galerie Molière, Paris
 Collective exhibition: “So Paper and Chenel processes”, Ateliers Chenel, Vanves

2012 
 Individual exhibition: «Passage 2006-2012 » exhibition at Sivera Wagram showroom, Paris 17eme
 "Connexions" exhibition: 6 years of collaboration with Ceccotti collezioni during the furniture    fair in April, Ceccotti showroom, Milan

2008 
 Individual exhibition: "Marée noire au clair de lune" exhibition at the Pierre Bergé gallery, Brussels, Belgium

2005 
 VIPP- customization of a ‘VIPP waste bin’ for the benefit of Handicap International, Silvera showroom, Paris

2004 
 Tokyo Designers Block, ‘everything is in everything,’ video, sound and smell exhibition, Tokyo
 Forum diffusion, Designers days 2004, Corian®, Five senses, one material, Paris

2003 
 Expérimenta Design, VIA, Design France: Innovation and inspiration, Lisbon
 BETC, placenta design, Paris

Books published

2016 
 Expérimenta Design, VIA, Design France: Innovation and inspiration, Lisbon
 Le design du pouvoir, l’Atelier de Recherche et de Création du Mobilier national – editions mare & martin – Transmissions Collection
 Come on! What is the future of Design, Top 40 French Creatives, author Yen Kien Hang
 #Cloud.paris - PCA editions – E-Lounge

2015 
 Le cabinet de curiosités de Thomas Erber – imprimerie du Marais – iPad cover with St Loup and Mangrove Table

2014 
 Paris Designers and their Interiors – Editions Luster - Noé Duchaufour-Lawrance's main house

2013 
 Space Plus –Sandu Publishing - Ciel de Paris 
 Living in Style –teNeues Publishing - Chalet La Transhumance

2012 

House Design – A&C Publishing Co., Ltd éditions – Chalet La Transhumance
Senequier – Verlhac éditions - Sénequier

2009 

Design and Literature –Norma éditions

2008 

Box Circa 40_2 – Fiera Milano editore

2007 

Contemporary World Interiors - Phaidon Press - Sketch
Wallpaper City Guide Paris - Phaidon - Senderens
Wallpaper City Guide Londres - Phaidon press - Sketch

2004 

Bars + Bares, Designer & Design - H Kliczowski publishing - Sketch
Cool restaurants London – TeNeus publishing - Sketch
Restaurant Design – DAAB publishing – Sketch
Les plus beaux restaurants du monde, design & architecture – Pyramid publishing

2020 
Made In Situ Gallery opening - 'Barro Negro' exhibition 
Made In Situ Gallery - 'Burnt Cork' exhibition

References 

1974 births
People from Mende, Lozère
21st-century French architects
French designers
Living people
École nationale supérieure des arts décoratifs alumni
Book by Emmanuel Berard https://livre.fnac.com/a15626118/Emmanuel-Berard-Noe-Duchaufour-Lawrance
Furniture designers
Industrial designers